American Eagle is a US brand name for the regional branch of American Airlines, under which six individual regional airlines operate short- and medium-haul feeder flights. Three of these airlines, Envoy Air (formerly American Eagle Airlines), Piedmont Airlines, and PSA Airlines, are wholly owned subsidiaries of the American Airlines Group. American Eagle's largest hub is Charlotte Douglas International's Concourse E, which operates over 340 flights per day, making it the largest express flight operation in the world.

History 

Prior to the Airline Deregulation Act in 1978, most major US air carriers had maintained close relationships with independent regional carriers in order to feed passengers from smaller markets into the larger cities, and, in turn, onto the larger legacy carriers. In the post-regulation era, the hub-and-spoke system gained prominence, and in order to feed traffic from smaller markets into these newly established hubs, the major carriers outsourced regional operations to these smaller carriers. These relationships included the use of code sharing, shared branding, and listing regional partners in the computer reservations systems of the mainline carrier.

American Eagle commenced service on November 1, 1984, with a flight from Fayetteville, Arkansas, to Dallas/Fort Worth International Airport (DFW). This flight was operated by Metroflight Airlines (a wholly owned subsidiary of Metro Airlines), using a Convair 580 turboprop aircraft. Metroflight also operated de Havilland Canada DHC-6 Twin Otter commuter turboprop aircraft on American Eagle flights serving DFW.  Other operators contracted by American Airlines to fly the American Eagle banner during this time included Air Midwest, Air Virginia (later AVAir), Chaparral Airlines, Command Airways, Simmons Airlines, and Wings West.

On September 15, 1986, Executive Airlines joined the American Eagle system. With hub operations at Luis Muñoz Marín International Airport in San Juan, Puerto Rico, the addition of Executive Airways to the American Eagle family opened up an extensive inter-island network throughout the Caribbean.

Between 1987 and 1989 AMR Corp. (parent corporation of American Airlines) gradually acquired most of its regional carriers, starting with Simmons Airlines. By 1991, AMR had consolidated its wholly owned regional carriers into four separate entities: Executive Airlines, Flagship Airlines, Simmons Airlines, and Wings West.  AMR would later purchase the assets of bankrupt Metro Airlines in 1993. At this point, AMR owned all of the airlines that were operating for American Eagle.

On May 15, 1998, Flagship Airlines and Wings West were merged into Simmons Airlines, with the new entity given the name American Eagle Airlines. Along with Executive Airlines, these would be the only two operators using the American Eagle brand name for the next fourteen years.

After American Airlines acquired Trans World Airlines (TWA) in 2001, it retained the contracts with the carriers that operated under the Trans World Express banner, which, at the time, included Chautauqua Airlines, Corporate Airlines, and Trans States Airlines. However, instead of being integrated into the American Eagle brand, these carriers operated under a separate regional brand known as AmericanConnection. This brand name was used for thirteen years before being discontinued in 2014.

2010s developments
As part of its restructuring and emergence from chapter 11 bankruptcy, AMR announced that it would start contracting American Eagle flying to carriers outside of its wholly owned subsidiaries. On November 15, 2012, SkyWest Airlines and ExpressJet Airlines, both subsidiaries of SkyWest, Inc. began operations for American Eagle. On August 1, 2013, Republic Airways a subsidiary of Republic Airways Holdings, commenced flying operations under the American Eagle branding as part of a 12-year capacity purchase agreement to operate Embraer 175 aircraft for American Eagle.

On September 12, 2012, AMR announced the discontinuation of the AmericanConnection brand, and all operations were going to be integrated into the American Eagle brand. However, Chautauqua Airlines, a subsidiary of Republic Airways Holdings, and the only operator of AmericanConnection flights at the time of the announcement, opted not to renew its contract. All AmericanConnection flights ended on August 19, 2014.

American Eagle service operated by Executive Airlines ceased operations on March 31, 2013. At the same time, its base at San Juan was dehubbed.

Due to the fact that an increasing number of other carriers were being contracted to fly under the American Eagle brand, it was announced on January 15, 2014, that American Eagle Airlines would change its name to Envoy Air. The name change took effect on April 15, 2014.

Compass Airlines, a subsidiary of Trans States Holdings, began American Eagle operations on March 27, 2015, as part of a deal to operate 20 new Embraer 175 aircraft on behalf of American. These aircraft are based at American's Los Angeles hub.

Air Wisconsin had announced it would exclusively fly as United Express which commenced in March 2018, ending their involvement in operating flights under the American Eagle brand.

In May 2018, American Airlines announced the termination of its partnerships with ExpressJet and Trans States Airlines as of 2019, meaning the end of those operators conducting American Eagle flights.

In March 2020, due to the reduction in flying in response to the COVID-19 pandemic, Compass Airlines announced that it would be ceasing operations on April 5, 2020, ending its operations as American Eagle.

In September 2020, Envoy Air, a subsidiary of American Eagle, announced a permanent closure at its two NY bases at LGA and JFK, due to a new codeshare agreement between American Airlines and JetBlue.

Operators and fleet

Fleet 

, the combined American Eagle branded fleet consists of the following regional jet aircraft:

Former operators

• In January 1988, Nashville Eagle became AMR Corp.’s first and only start-up airline, using equipment acquired from Air Midwest.
• Business Express was acquired by AMR Eagle Holdings Corporation in March 1999, although it never flew under the American Eagle brand before being fully integrated into American Eagle Airlines, Inc. in December 2000.

Historical regional jet fleet
The American Eagle brand, through its various regional and commuter airline partners, operated a variety of twinjet aircraft over the years including the following types:

 Bombardier CRJ100
 Bombardier CRJ200 Retired early due to the COVID-19 Pandemic.
 Embraer ERJ135
 Embraer ERJ140 Launch customer.
 Embraer ERJ145

Historical turboprop fleet

The American Eagle brand, through its various regional and commuter airline partners, operated a variety of twin-turboprop aircraft over the years including the following types:

 ATR 42
 ATR 72
 BAe Jetstream 31
 BAe Jetstream 32
 Beechcraft Model 99
 de Havilland Canada DHC-6 Twin Otter
 de Havilland Canada Dash 8-100
 de Havilland Canada Dash 8-300 Operated by Piedmont.
 CASA 212
 Convair 580
 Fairchild Swearingen Metroliner
 Grumman Gulfstream I
 NAMC YS-11
 Saab 340
 Short 330
 Short 360

Destinations

Accidents and incidents
 May 8, 1987: American Eagle Flight 5452, operated by regional airline Executive Airlines, a CASA 212-200, was on a domestically scheduled passenger flight between San Juan, Puerto Rico-Mayaguez, Puerto Rico when it crashed short of Runway 09 while landing at Mayaguez. After impacting, the plane continued through a chain-link fence and a ditch. Of the six occupants onboard (four passengers and two crew), two were killed. The cause of the crash was determined to be improper maintenance in setting the flight idle propeller and engine fuel flow.
 February 19, 1988: American Eagle Flight 3378, a Fairchild Swearingen Metroliner operated by AVAir, was on a regularly scheduled flight between Raleigh-Richmond when it crashed into a reservoir about a mile from Raleigh-Durham International Airport, from where it had departed, in the vicinity of Cary, North Carolina. The aircraft departed during low-ceiling, low-visibility, and night conditions. Analysis of radar data indicated the aircraft was in a 45-degree descending turn. Both crew members and all 10 passengers were killed.
 June 7, 1992: American Eagle Flight 5456, operated by regional airline Executive Airlines, was on a regular flight between San Juan, Puerto Rico and Mayaguez, Puerto Rico when it lost control and crashed nose-down about 3/4 mile from the Mayaguez, Puerto Rico airport. Both crew and all three passengers were killed. The aircraft involved was a CASA 212-200.
 February 1, 1994: American Eagle Flight 3641, a Saab 340 operated by Simmons Airlines, crash landed at False River Air Park in New Roads, Louisiana, only one minor injury was reported.
 October 31, 1994: American Eagle Flight 4184, an ATR 72 operated by AMR's regional airline Simmons Airlines, crashed near Roselawn, Indiana. The aircraft inverted, dived, and crashed from a holding pattern at 10,000 feet (3050 m) "after a ridge of ice accreted beyond the deice boots" resulting in an unexpected aileron hinge moment reversal that subsequently resulted in the loss of control. The four crew and 64 passengers were all killed. In the months following the accident, American Eagle redeployed its ATR fleet to Miami and the Caribbean where icing is not an issue. The aircraft manufacturer, ATR, has since improved the anti-ice boots. The American Eagle aircraft were modified with the updated deicing system. All ATR 72s were retired from American Eagle's fleet in 2013.
 December 13, 1994: American Eagle Flight 3379, operated by AMR's regional airline Flagship Airlines, a Jetstream 31, was on a regularly scheduled Raleigh-Greensboro-Raleigh service when it crashed into a wooded area about four miles southwest of the Raleigh-Durham International Airport in the vicinity of Morrisville, NC. Of the 20 onboard (18 passengers and two crewmembers) 15 were killed while the five survivors received serious injuries. The probable cause of the crash was the pilot not following proper procedure in an engine-failure situation.
 July 9, 1995: American Eagle Flight 4127, an ATR 72 operated by Simmons Airlines, experienced a loss of the rear cabin entry door during its climb after taking off from O'Hare International Airport in Chicago. The cabin door opened shortly after the first officer began to pressurize the cabin; therefore, only a slight pressure differential existed between the cabin pressure and the atmospheric pressure. Lack of damage indicates the door was unlocked/unlatched when it opened. The airplane was one of fifteen aircraft equipped with a new handrail and door handle design which was different from the majority of the ATR 72 fleet. The old handle was pulled down to latch/lock the door and pushed up to unlatch/unlock the door. The direction of motion was reversed so that the handle was pushed up to latch/lock the door and pulled down to unlatch/unlock the door. A private citizen located the separated door in approximately two feet of water in the Des Plaines River on July 10, 1995. Following this incident, ATR designed another new door handle design which returns the handle motion to push up to unlatch/unlock, and pull down to latch/lock.
 May 8, 1999: American Eagle Flight 4925, a Saab 340B, registered N232AE, crashed on approach to JFK airport after being held in a holding pattern due to the visibility on the ground being below minimums. The flight descended too rapidly, however because the flight crew were sleep deprived, they believed they were descending normally, even though there were cockpit alarms going off telling that they were not, in fact radar data revealed that they were descending at 2,950 ft/min. Later, when the flight was over the runway, the pilot descended and touched down 7,000 feet past the touch down point, and even though they used full brakes and reverse thrust, the plane departed the runway at 75 knots and traveled 248 feet past the threshold before stopping. As a result, there was only 1 serious injury, everyone else was unharmed. The NTSB determined that pilot fatigue was a culprit in the accident.
 May 9, 2004: American Eagle Flight 5401, an ATR 72 operated by Executive Airlines, crashed in San Juan, Puerto Rico after the captain lost control of the aircraft while landing. Seventeen people were injured, but there were no fatalities.
 January 2006: American Eagle Flight 3008 from San Luis Obispo to Los Angeles, a Saab 340 operated by American Eagle Airlines, encountered icing at 11,000 feet and regained control only at 6,500 feet, after some 50 seconds' descent. During the incident, in which no one was injured, the autopilot disconnected, the stall alarm/clacker sounded, and the plane rolled sharply left and right, experienced vibration, and pitched down. Manual deice boots were activated and ice could be heard shedding off and striking the fuselage. The NTSB report on this incident referenced three other Saab 340 icing incidents, as well as the Flight 4184 incident referenced above. The three were Nov. 11, 1998, in Eildon Weir, Victoria, Australia; June 28, 2002, in Bathurst, New South Wales, Australia; and June 18, 2004, in Albury, New South Wales, Australia.
 February 15, 2017: American Eagle Flight 5320 from Charlotte Douglas International Airport to Gulfport–Biloxi International Airport struck a deer while taking off from runway 36C. The CRJ-700 was forced to turn around and abort the flight. The plane could be seen trailing a vapor stream from the right-wing as it circled back to land. Officials said there was a fuel leak, and crews sprayed the plane with foam. There were no injuries.
November 11, 2019: American Eagle Flight 4125 from Greensboro, North Carolina, to Chicago O’ Hare International Airport, an Embraer ERJ-145 operated by Envoy Air, slid off the runway while landing in icy conditions.  All 38 passengers and three crew were uninjured.

References

External links 
American Airlines fleet

American Airlines
Companies that filed for Chapter 11 bankruptcy in 2011
Regional Airline Association members
Oneworld affiliate members
Regional airline brands
Regional airlines of the United States
Airlines based in Texas
Airlines established in 1984